Grahovo ob Bači is a village on the Bača River in the Municipality of Tolmin in the Littoral region of Slovenia.

Name
The name of the settlement was changed from Grahovo to Grahovo ob Bači (literally, 'Grahovo on the Bača River') in 1955. The name is believed to have the same origin as Grahovo in the Municipality of Cerknica. If so, it is probably derived from the personal name Grah, which is still preserved as a surname in Slovenia and is probably borrowed from the Old High German name Gracco. The place name would thus mean 'Grah's (village)'. Another possible derivation is from the common noun *grahovišče 'pea field' via the contracted form *grahovše. Direct derivation from the Slovene common noun grah 'pea' is unlikely because of the rarity of such names and the suffixation pattern.

Church

The parish church in the settlement is dedicated to Saint Anne and belongs to the Koper Diocese.

Other cultural heritage
The village was one of the main filming locations for the 1948 film On Our Own Land. The east end of the Bukovo Tunnel on the Bohinj Railway stands in the easternmost part of the settlement's territory.

Gallery

References

External links 

Grahovo ob Bači on Geopedia

Populated places in the Municipality of Tolmin